Taylen Green is an American football quarterback for the Boise State Broncos.

High school career
Green attended Lewisville High School in Lewisville, Texas. As a junior, he passed for 2,217 yards and 25 touchdowns. He committed to Boise State University to play college football.

College career
Green played in two games as a backup to Hank Bachmeier his first year at Boise State in 2021. He started 2022 as the backup to Bachmeier, before becoming the starter. In his first career start, he passed for 48 yards but rushed for 105 with two touchdowns.

Statistics

References

External links
Boise State Broncos bio

Living people
Players of American football from Texas
American football quarterbacks
Boise State Broncos football players
Year of birth missing (living people)